Horns and Halos is the seventh solo studio album by Finnish rock singer Michael Monroe. Michael Monroe stated about the album title Horns and Halos: "We all have a bit of both within us – Yin and Yang, Devils and Angels etc. However – Love and Light always conquers the darkness in the end".

Singles
Horns and Halos debuted at number one on the Official Finnish Albums Chart.

Track listing
Digital download

Personnel
 Michael Monroe – lead vocals, sax, harmonica
 Steve Conte – guitars, main background vocals
 Dregen – guitars, background vocals
 Sam Yaffa – bass, background vocals
 Karl Rockfist – drums, background vocals

Charts

References

2013 albums
Michael Monroe albums
Spinefarm Records albums